HLDE may refer to:
 Daegu Broadcasting Corporation
 HldE, the name of several genes